Nikita Akimovich Khromov (1892 in Saint Petersburg – 1934 in Rostov-on-Don) was a Russian Empire and Soviet football player. Khromov made his debut for the Russian Empire on 30 June 1912 in a 1912 Olympics game against Finland.

Honours
 Russia Champion: 1912

References

External links
  Profile

1892 births
1934 deaths
Footballers from the Russian Empire
Footballers at the 1912 Summer Olympics
Olympic footballers of Russia
Soviet footballers
Association football midfielders